Joseph Bucher House is a historic home located at Marietta, Lancaster County, Pennsylvania. It was built between about 1806 and 1811, and is a -story, three bay brick dwelling. It has a "side hall" Georgian plan.

It was listed on the National Register of Historic Places in 1979.

References

Houses completed in 1811
Houses on the National Register of Historic Places in Pennsylvania
Georgian architecture in Pennsylvania
Houses in Lancaster County, Pennsylvania
National Register of Historic Places in Lancaster County, Pennsylvania